Palaeeudyptes klekowskii, also known as the colossus penguin,  was a species of the extinct penguin genus Palaeeudyptes. It was until recently thought to have been approximately the size of its congener Palaeeudyptes antarcticus, which would mean it was somewhat larger than the modern emperor penguin, but a new study shows it was in fact almost twice as tall. Knowledge of it comes from an extensive collection of fossil bones from the Late Eocene (34-37 MYA) of the La Meseta Formation on Seymour Island, Antarctica. P. klekowskii was at first not recognized as a distinct species, and despite the coexistence of two so closely related species of similar size as Palaeeudyptes gunnari and P. klekowskii seeming somewhat improbable, the amount of fossil material suggests that the two species are indeed diagnosably different.

References

 Jadwiszczak, Piotr (2006): Eocene penguins of Seymour Island, Antarctica: Taxonomy. Polish Polar Research 27(1): 3–62. PDF fulltext
 Myrcha, Andrzej; Jadwiszczak, Piotr; Tambussi, Claudia P.; Noriega, Jorge I.; Gaździcki, Andrzej; Tatur, Andrzej & Del Valle, Rodolfo A. (2002): Taxonomic revision of Eocene Antarctic penguins based on tarsometatarsal morphology. Polish Polar Research 23(1): 5–46. PDf fulltext
 Myrcha, Andrzej; Tatur, Andrzej & Del Valle, Rodolfo A. (1990) A new species of fossil penguin from Seymour Island, West Antarctica. Alcheringa 14: 195–205.

klekowskii
Eocene birds
Extinct penguins
Cenozoic Antarctica
Cenozoic animals of Oceania
Extinct animals of Antarctica
Cenozoic animals of Antarctica